Heidi Androl (born October 29, 1980) is an American television sports reporter. Androl currently serves as a host on NHL Network. She was an interviewer for Showtime at Strikeforce Mixed martial arts events.

Biography
The oldest of three children, Androl was raised in Wisner, Michigan. Androl began modeling at age 13, and appeared in advertising, television and film. She attended the University of Michigan-Flint and Michigan State University, then moved to Los Angeles.

As a model, Androl appeared on networks including  ESPN, USA, CBS, NBC, Fox, UPN, E! and TNT. Her hosting career has included topics on sports, entertainment and business.

In NFL, Androl working selected games with either analyst Heath Evans or Charles Davis and either play-by-play Sam Rosen or Gus Johnson.

Androl was hired as an apprentice in aerospace industry. She was promoted to the position of national sales manager for FDC Aerofilter within a year, and then to International Sales Manager.

After appearing on The Apprentice Androl became Special Events Host of The Los Angeles Kings, involved with the club's official website and their online video network.

 Androl hosted AT&T U-verse Theatre for AT&T U-verse, and NHL on the Fly on NHL Network. She works with Sam Rosen and Heath Evans on regional NFL telecasts for Fox.

The Apprentice appearance
Androl was on The Apprentice TV show, season 6, but did not win.

References

External links
 
 Heidi Androl on the Los Angeles Kings website

 Heidi's Zoodango Profile
 The NBC Apprentice Season 6 Bio

1980 births
Businesspeople from Michigan
Living people
People from Tuscola County, Michigan
Participants in American reality television series
Los Angeles Kings announcers
National Hockey League broadcasters
Women sports announcers
Mixed martial arts broadcasters
National Football League announcers
Boxing commentators
University of Michigan–Flint alumni
Michigan State University alumni
The Apprentice (franchise) contestants